William Leonard Laurence (March 7, 1888 – March 19, 1977) was a Jewish American science journalist best known for his work at The New York Times. Born in the Russian Empire, he won two Pulitzer Prizes. As the official historian of the Manhattan Project, he was the only journalist to witness the Trinity test and the atomic bombing of Nagasaki. He is credited with coining the iconic term "Atomic Age," which became popular in the 1950s. Infamously, he dismissed the destructive effects of radiation sickness as Japanese propaganda in The New York Times. Even though he had seen the effects first-hand, he had been on the War Department payroll, and was asked by United States military officials to do so in order to discredit earlier reports by independent journalist Wilfred Burchett, the first reporter on-site after the bombings.

Early life and career
Laurence was born Leib Wolf Siew in Salantai, a small city in the Russian Empire that is now in Lithuania. He emigrated to the United States in 1905, after participating in the Russian Revolution of 1905, and he soon changed his name, taking "William" after William Shakespeare, "Leonard" after Leonardo da Vinci, and "Lawrence" after a street he lived on in Roxbury, Massachusetts (but spelled with a "u" in reference to Friedrich Schiller's Laura). Although he attended Harvard University (1908–1911; 1914–1915) and allegedly completed all coursework for his undergraduate degree, Laurence maintained in a later Columbia University oral history that it was not conferred due to a personality conflict with the dean of Harvard College. Following additional studies at the University of Besançon (1919) and Harvard Law School (1921), he ultimately received his LL.B. from the Boston University School of Law in 1925. He became a naturalized US citizen in 1913. During World War I, he served with the US Army Signal Corps.

Eschewing a legal career, he began working as a journalist for the New York World in 1926. In 1930, he joined The New York Times and specialized when possible in reporting scientific issues. He married Florence Davidow in 1931.

In 1934, Laurence co-founded the National Association of Science Writers, and in 1936, he covered the Harvard Tercenary Conference of Arts and Sciences; he and four other science reporters shared the 1937 Pulitzer Prize for Reporting for that work.

"Atomic Bill"

On May 5, 1940, Laurence published a front-page exclusive in the New York Times on successful attempts in isolating uranium-235 which were reported in Physical Review, and outlined many (somewhat hyperbolic) claims about the possible future of nuclear power. He had assembled it in part out of his own fear that Nazi Germany was attempting to develop atomic energy, and had hoped the article would galvanize a U.S. effort.

Though his article had no effect on the U.S. bomb program, it was passed to the Soviet mineralogist Vladimir Vernadsky by his son, George Vernadsky, a professor of history at Yale University, and motivated Vernadsky to urge Soviet authorities to embark on their own atomic program, and established one of the first commissions to formulate "a plan of measures which it would be necessary to realize in connection with the possibility of using intraatomic energy". A Soviet atomic bomb project got started c. 1942; a full-scale Soviet atomic energy program began after the war.

On September 7, 1940, The Saturday Evening Post ran an article by Laurence on atomic fission, "The Atom Gives Up". In 1943, government officials asked librarians nationwide to withdraw the issue.

In April 1945, Laurence was summoned to the secret Los Alamos laboratory in New Mexico by Major General Leslie Groves to serve as the official historian  of the Manhattan Project. In this capacity he was also the author of many of the first official press releases about nuclear weapons, including some delivered by the Department of War and President Harry S. Truman. He was the only journalist present at the Trinity test in July 1945, and beforehand prepared statements to be delivered in case the test ended in a disaster which killed those involved. As part of his work related to the Project, he also interviewed the airmen who flew on the mission to drop the atomic bomb on the city of Hiroshima, Japan. Laurence himself flew aboard the B-29 The Great Artiste, which served as a blast instrumentation aircraft, for the atomic bombing of Nagasaki. He visited the test Able site at Bikini Atoll aboard the press ship Appalachian, for the bomb test on July 1, 1946.

US military encouraged the journalist William L. Laurence of The New York Times to write articles dismissing the reports of radiation sickness as part of Japanese efforts to undermine American morale. Laurence, who was also being paid by the US War Department, wrote the articles the US military wanted even though he was aware of the effects of radiation after observing the first atomic bomb test on 16 July 1945, and its effect on local residents and livestock.

For his 1945 coverage of the atomic bomb, beginning with the eyewitness account from Nagasaki, he won a second Pulitzer Prize for Reporting in 1946. At the office of the Times he was thereafter referred to as "Atomic Bill", to differentiate him from William H. Lawrence, a political reporter at the newspaper.

In his autobiography, Richard Feynman mentioned William Laurence standing next to him during the Trinity test. Feynman stated, "I had been the one who was supposed to have taken him around. Then it was found that it was too technical for him, and so later H.D. Smyth came and I showed him around." Nuclear historian Alex Wellerstein has called Laurence "part huckster, part journalist, all wild card ... improbable in every way, a real-life character with more strangeness than would seem tolerable in pure fiction."

In 1946, he published an account of the Trinity test as Dawn Over Zero, which went through at least two revisions. He continued to work at the Times through the 1940s and into the 1950s, and published a book on defense against nuclear war in 1950. In 1951, his book The Hell Bomb warned about the use of a cobalt bomb – a form of hydrogen bomb (still an untested device at the time he wrote it) engineered to produce a maximum amount of nuclear fallout.

In 1956, he was present at the testing of a hydrogen bomb at the Pacific Proving Grounds. That same year, he was appointed science editor of the Times, succeeding Waldemar Kaempffert. He served in this capacity until he retired in 1964.

He received honorary doctorates from Boston University (Sc.D., 1946), the Stevens Institute of Technology (Sc.D., 1951), Grinnell College (D.H.L., 1951) and Yeshiva University (D.H.L., 1957).

Laurence is one of the first commentators to have compared the atomic bomb to a monster, which helped to create a cultural trope that may have influenced such films as The Beast from 20,000 Fathoms and Godzilla: "It kept struggling in an elemental fury, like a creature in act of breaking the bonds that held it down" and "a monstrous prehistoric creature."

Criticisms
In 2021, the historian Alex Wellerstein asserted that Laurence was "willingly complicit in the government’s propaganda project", referring to Laurence's collaboration with the United States Department of War to produce articles on the atomic bomb, its production and effects.

Death
Laurence died in 1977 in Majorca, Spain, of complications from a blood clot in his brain.

Bibliography
Dawn Over Zero: The Story of the Atomic Bomb, New York: Knopf, 1946.
We Are Not Helpless: How We Can Defend Ourselves against Atomic Weapons, New York, 1950.
The Hell Bomb, New York: Knopf, 1951.
Men and Atoms: The Discovery, the Uses, and the Future of Atomic Energy, New York: Simon and Schuster, 1959.

See also

Propaganda in the United States
American propaganda during World War II

References

Sources
Keever, Beverly Deepe. News Zero: the New York Times and the Bomb. Common Courage Press, 2004. 
Weart, Spencer. Nuclear Fear: A History of Images. Cambridge, MA: Harvard University Press, 1988.

External links
Annotated Bibliography for William L. Laurence from the Alsos Digital Library for Nuclear Issues 
Bio of Laurence at NuclearFiles.org
"Hiroshima Cover-up: Stripping the War Department's Times man of His Pulitzer" – from Democracy Now!, August 5, 2005 (video, audio, and print transcript)
From the Archives - The New York Times: a collection of 11 nuclear articles by William L. Laurence

American male journalists
Boston University School of Law alumni
Harvard Law School alumni
Emigrants from the Russian Empire to the United States
Manhattan Project people
People associated with the atomic bombings of Hiroshima and Nagasaki
People from Salantai
Pulitzer Prize for Reporting winners
The New York Times writers
1888 births
1977 deaths
Naturalized citizens of the United States